Telegard is an early bulletin board system (BBS) software program written for IBM PC-compatible computers running MS-DOS and OS/2. Telegard was written in Pascal with routines written in C++ and assembly language, based on a copy of the WWIV source code.

Telegard has several features that make it attractive to BBS sysops, such as being free, having remote administration facilities built into the main program, and the ability to handle CD-ROMs internally. Telegard is still viable today as it can accept telnet connections by using a virtual modem/FOSSIL set up such as NetSerial, a virtual modem driver, and NetFoss, a freeware FOSSIL driver, both for Windows. OS/2 users can use the SIO/VMODEM combination to allow telnet access to their BBS.

External links

 Telegard BBS Software Homepage

See also
Renegade (BBS)
WWIV
OpenTG

References

Bulletin board system software
DOS software